Fernando Arodi Vega Félix (born 19 February 1998) is a Mexican athlete specialising in the 400 metres hurdles. He represented his country at the 2019 World Championships reaching the semifinals.

His personal best in the event is 49.32 seconds set in Naples in 2019. This is the current national record.

International competitions

References

1998 births
Living people
Mexican male hurdlers
World Athletics Championships athletes for Mexico
Universiade medalists in athletics (track and field)
Universiade gold medalists for Mexico
Medalists at the 2019 Summer Universiade
Competitors at the 2018 Central American and Caribbean Games